Sinkat is a small town in eastern Sudan.

It is the main city of the district of the same name and, in some respects, the "capital" of the Hadendowa.

Transport
It is served by a station on the mainline of the Sudan railway network.

Climate
Sinkat has a very warm desert climate (Köppen BWh) with very hot summers and pleasantly warm winters. Rainfall is minimal except for July - August, when easterly winds bring 62 millimetres of rain. Sinkat has some, though very sparse, erratic, and negligible rain in nearly every month of the year. This town lies some 900 metres above sea level and thus is on average 5 degrees colder than nearby port town of Suakin.

See also
 Railway stations in Sudan

References 

Populated places in Red Sea (state)